Bertha Wellin (11 September 1870 – 27 July 1951) was a Swedish politician (Conservative) and nurse. She was one of the first five women to be elected into the Swedish parliament.

Life
Bertha Wellin was the daughter of the tax collector of Vickleby, Alrik Wellin, and Jenny Melén.

Nursing career
Wellin was educated as a nurse at the Sophiahemmet in Stockholm, and was employed within the Stockholm Poor Care.

Wellin was a board member of several of the medical centers in Stockholm, such as Sophiahemmet (1917). She was a co-founder and a member of the board of directors of the Svensk sjuksköterskeförening ('Swedish Nurses Association') or SSF in 1910 and chairperson from 1914 to 1933. From 1920, she served as a member of the board of directors in the Committee of Nordic Nurses Cooperation. From 1911, she was the editor of Svensk sjukskötersketidning ('Paper of the Swedish Nurse').

Political career
In 1912, sWellinhe was elected to the Stockholm City Council as a Conservative, and in 1919, she became a board of directors of the Public Health Care. In 1921, she became one of the first five women to be elected to the Swedish Parliament after women suffrage alongside Nelly Thüring (Social Democrat), Agda Östlund (Social Democrat) and Elisabeth Tamm (liberal) in the Lower chamber, and Kerstin Hesselgren in the Upper chamber. She left her seat in 1935.

As an MP, Wellin was foremost engaged in issues regarding the nursing profession. As a conservative, her view of nursing was that it was not to be regarded as a profession but as a holy calling of mercy. Her work both as an MP and as head of the Nursing Association was affected by this view, which blocked questions regarding higher wages and less working hours. This gradually caused more conflicts within the nursing association, when the association became more and more dominated by nurses who did not come from a wealthy background, but who needed to support themselves on their salaries, who demanded higher wages and set working hours, and wished to be regarded as professionals rather than as philanthropic workers. In 1932–33, the professional party had gained majority within the nursing association, and Wellin saw herself forced to resign from her chair, leaving the meeting as well as the association singing psalms. She left her seat in the Parliament as well, when she did not run for the 1936 election.

Wellin was given the Florence Nightingale Medal in 1935.

Sources
 ”Nordisk familjebok, Wellin, Bertha". 1904–1926.
 Svenska dagbladets årsbok. Stockholm: Svenska dagbladet. 1936. Sid. 22. Libris 283647
 Dufva, S., G (2010). Klass och genus i vården. I H. Strömberg & H. Eriksson (Red.), Genusperspektiv på vård och omvårdnad (s.50).
 Ann-Cathrine Haglund, Ann-Marie Petersson, Inger Ström-Billing, red (2004). Moderata pionjärer: kvinnor i politiskt arbete 1900–2000. Stockholm: Sällskapet för moderata kvinnors historia. Libris 9666368.  (inb.) Bertha Wellin, 1870–1951. Högerns första kvinnliga riksdagsledamot av Stina Nicklasson och Ann-Marie Petersson

Further reading 
 

1870 births
1951 deaths
Members of the Riksdag
Women members of the Riksdag
Swedish nurses
Florence Nightingale Medal recipients
20th-century Swedish women politicians
Burials at Norra begravningsplatsen
Recipients of the Illis quorum